Afrosyrphus is an African genus of hoverfly. They mimic stingless bees, having long, upward pointing antennae and hairy hind legs.  Larvae feed on aphids.

Species
Currently, there are two described species.
Afrosyrphus varipes  Curran, 1927
Afrosyrphus schmuttereri  Mengual, Ssymank, Skevington, Reemer & Ståhls, 2020

Distribution
Zaire, Angola, Cameroon,  Kenya, South Africa, Democratic Republic of Congo, Uganda.

References

Syrphini
Diptera of Africa
Hoverfly genera
Taxa named by Charles Howard Curran